The Barrathon is an annual half marathon which takes place on the Isle of Barra, which is the southernmost inhabited isle of the Outer Hebrides in Scotland. The Barrathon was initially a single event to mark the millennium, and a chance to raise some money for charity at the same time. The Charity was MacMillan Cancer Support.

Recent winners
Table of recent winners.

Route
The Barrathon route is a clockwise circuit of the island, following an undulating course, the lowest point being near sea level and the highest point being just under 350 ft.

The route starts in Castlebay at about 60 ft falling quickly to sea level before rising to 100 ft around the 1-mile mark.   The next 0.5 miles is mainly downhill and then the course undulates between sea level and 50 ft until the 4-mile mark.

From mile 4, the course climbs gradually as the route starts to head east, peaking at around 170 ft just past the 5.5-mile stage.  The next 1.5 miles see the route drop back to sea level as the 7-mile mark is approached.

From miles 7 to 9, the route starts to work its way round the east coast of the island over a number of short, small climbs ranging from 50 ft to 90 ft.  This is quickly followed by a downhill 0.5-mile and a gently undulating course to the 10.5-mile mark.  From here the route climbs steeply to 340 ft at the 11.5-mile stage.

The route offers some respite with a mile long descent followed by a short but sharp climb of approximately 40 ft before a fairly steady run to the finish point in Castlebay.

The course was officially measured in 2008 by a company on behalf of Scottish Athletics and meets the minimum distance for a half marathon.  The official record is over the measured course.

Fun Runs
There is also a "Fun Run" which is 3 miles.  Runners must be 11 or over. Additionally, there is also a "Junior Fun Run" which is approximately 1 mile.  The Junior Fun Run is for runners aged 4–10.

References

External links

Half marathons in the United Kingdom
Sport in the Outer Hebrides
Athletics competitions in Scotland
Road running in Scotland
Barra
Summer events in Scotland